Novembre (French and Italian for 'November') may refer to:

Arts and entertainment
 "Novembre" (song), by Giusy Ferreri, 2008
 Novembre (band), an Italian heavy metal band
 Novembre (film), a 2022 French film also titled as November

People
 Cristiano Novembre (born 1987), Italian footballer 
 Fabio Novembre (born 1966), Italian architect and designer
 John Novembre (born 1977/1978), American computational biologist 
 Tom Novembre (born 1959), French actor and singer

See also
 
 November (disambiguation)
 Noviembre (film), a 2003 Spanish film